Forgotten Pleasures is the debut studio album release by Findlay. It was released on March 3, 2017 via digital, cd, limited vinyl under BMG.  Findlay is accompanied by Jules Apollinaire (also a co-producer) on keyboards, bass and guitar. Ben Simon on guitar, Christina Lamas on drums, as well as producers Jake Gosling (The Libertines, Ed Sheeran), Samy Osta (Woman, Fire Chatterton, Rover!) and Flood (Nick Cave, Depeche Mode, Smashing Pumpkins).

Track listing

References
 Doyle Antony Smith, Album Review Velvet Independent (March 4, 2017)
 Jeannie Blue, Album Review Cryptic Rock (March 13, 2017)

2017 debut albums
BMG Rights Management albums